China National Highway 341 will run from Jiaonan in Shandong to Haiyan in Qinghai. It is one of the new trunk highways proposed in the China National Highway Network Planning (2013 - 2030).

Status
Shandong
Complete between Jiaonan and Zhucheng. The section is mainly upgraded former provincial highways S324 and S710.
Henan
Completed around Nanle and Anyang.
Shanxi
The Shanxi section is under planning.
Shaanxi
Completed around Yan'an.

Gansu (eastern section)

There are no plans yet to start construction in Huachi County (Shaanxi border-Huan County). Construction is in progress between Huan County urban area and the border with Ningxia. This section will be a 2x2 lane limited-access road.
Ningxia
Construction has started. The route enters Ningxia at Zhaike township, through Sanhe (Heicheng) town, where it crosses G344.
Gansu (western section) 
Construction of the 61 km section between Baiyin and Lanzhou New Area started in 2017 and was completed in 2021.
Qinghai
Construction has started from Jiading at the border with Gansu to the terminus in Haiyan. Completed within Huzhu County.

Route table

References

`
Transport in Shandong
Transport in Henan
Transport in Shanxi
Transport in Shaanxi
Transport in Gansu
Transport in Qinghai